Joy Dawn Tetley (born 9 November  1946) is a Church of England priest. She was Archdeacon of Worcester from 1999 to 2008.
 
Tetley was educated at St Hugh's College, Oxford and ordained deaconess in 1977, deacon  in 1987 and priest in 1994. She was a Lecturer at Trinity College, Bristol from 1983 to 1986; Rochester's Diocesan Director of Post-Ordination Training from 1988 to 1993; and Principal of the East Anglian Ministerial Training Course from 1993 to 1999. After her years as an Archdeacon she was the Area Director of Ordinands for the Diocese of Oxford from  2009 to 2010.

References

1946 births
Living people
Alumni of St Hugh's College, Oxford
Archdeacons of Worcester
Staff of Trinity College, Bristol